Matej Soklič (born 15 June 1973) is a Slovenian cross-country skier. He competed in the men's sprint event at the 2002 Winter Olympics.

References

1973 births
Living people
Slovenian male cross-country skiers
Olympic cross-country skiers of Slovenia
Cross-country skiers at the 2002 Winter Olympics
People from Bled